Obadius is a genus of beetles in the family Carabidae, containing the following species:

 Obadius affinis Tremoleras, 1931
 Obadius insignis Burmeister, 1875

References

Scaritinae